Issa Laye Thiaw (1943 – 10 September 2017) was a Senegalese historian, theologian and author on Serer religion, Serer tradition and history. Born into a Serer family, himself the son of a Serer High Priest (Saltigue), Thiaw is a specialist in the Serer religion.  He was a former researcher at the  Centre d’études des civilisations (CEC) de Dakar (Centre for Studies in Civilizations of Dakar).

Some of Thiaw's works include:

Issa Laye Thiaw. La femme Seereer, Sénégal, 2005, Sociétés africaines et diaspora. Edition L'harmattan, 
Issa Laye Thiaw. "La religiosité Seereer, avant et pendant leur Islamisation." Dans: Ethiopiques, No. 55 (1992)

See also
Serer people
Serer religion
List of Senegalese writers

References

Serer writers
Scholars of the Serer religion
Scholars of Serer history
Serer historians
Senegalese non-fiction writers
1943 births
2017 deaths
People from Thiès Region
Senegalese pan-Africanists